Union is an unincorporated community in Logan County, Illinois, United States. Union is located east of Emden and west of Atlanta.

References

Unincorporated communities in Logan County, Illinois
Unincorporated communities in Illinois